Tetrachloroethylene, also known under the systematic name tetrachloroethene, or perchloroethylene, and abbreviations such as "perc" (or "PERC"), and "PCE", is a chlorocarbon with the formula Cl2C=CCl2. It is a colorless liquid widely used for dry cleaning of fabrics, hence it is sometimes called "dry-cleaning fluid". It also has its uses as an effective automotive brake cleaner. It has a sweet odor, similar to the smell of chloroform, detectable by most people at a concentration of 1 part per million (1 ppm).

History and production
French chemist Henri Victor Regnault first synthesized tetrachloroethylene in 1839 by thermal decomposition of hexachloroethane following Michael Faraday's 1820 synthesis of "protochloride of carbon" (carbon tetrachloride). 
C2Cl6 → C2Cl4 + Cl2
Faraday was previously falsely credited for the synthesis of tetrachloroethylene, which in reality was actually carbon tetrachloride. While trying to make Faraday's "protochloride of carbon", Regnault found that his compound was different from Faraday's.

Tetrachloroethylene can be made by passing chloroform vapour through a red-hot tube, the side products include hexachlorobenzene and hexachloroethane, as reported in 1886.

Most tetrachloroethylene is produced by high temperature chlorinolysis of light hydrocarbons. The method is related to Faraday's discovery since hexachloroethane is generated and thermally decomposes. Side products include carbon tetrachloride, hydrogen chloride, and hexachlorobutadiene.

Several other methods have been developed. When 1,2-dichloroethane is heated to 400 °C with chlorine, tetrachloroethylene is produced by the chemical reaction:
ClCH2CH2Cl + 3 Cl2   →   Cl2C=CCl2 + 4 HCl
This reaction can be catalyzed by a mixture of potassium chloride and aluminium chloride or by activated carbon.  Trichloroethylene is a major byproduct, which is separated by distillation.

Uses
Tetrachloroethylene is an excellent solvent for organic materials. Otherwise it is volatile, highly stable and nonflammable, and has low toxicity. For these reasons, it is widely used in dry cleaning. It is also used to degrease metal parts in the automotive and other metalworking industries, usually as a mixture with other chlorocarbons. It appears in a few consumer products including paint strippers and spot removers. It is also used in aerosol preparations.

Historical applications
Tetrachloroethylene was once extensively used as an intermediate in the manufacture of HFC-134a and related refrigerants. In the early 20th century, tetrachloroethene was used for the treatment of hookworm infestation.

Health and safety
The acute toxicity of tetrachloroethylene is moderate to low. Reports of human injury are uncommon despite its wide usage in dry cleaning and degreasing.  Despite the advantages of tetrachloroethylene, many have called for its replacement from widespread commercial use. It has been described as a "neurotoxicant, liver and
kidney toxicant, and reproductive and developmental toxicant ... a 'potential occupational carcinogen'"..

Testing for exposure
Tetrachloroethylene exposure can be evaluated by a breath test, analogous to breath-alcohol measurements. Also, for acute exposures, tetrachloroethylene in expired air can be measured. Tetrachloroethylene can be detected in the breath for weeks following a heavy exposure. Tetrachloroethylene and trichloroacetic acid (TCA), a breakdown product of tetrachloroethylene, can be detected in the blood.

In Europe, the Scientific Committee on Occupational Exposure Limits (SCOEL) recommends for tetrachloroethylene an occupational exposure limit (8 hour time-weighted average) of 20 ppm and a short-term exposure limit (15 min) of 40 ppm.

Remediation and degradation
In principle, tetrachloroethylene contamination can be remediated by chemical treatment. Chemical treatment involves reducing metals such as iron powder. 

In addition to bioremediation, tetrachloroethylene hydrolyzes on contact with soil. 

Bioremediation usually entails reductive dechlorination usually under anaerobic conditions.  Dehalococcoides sp. under aerobic conditions by cometabolism by Pseudomonas sp.  Products of biodegradation products include trichloroethylene, cis-1,2-dichloroethene and vinyl chloride; full degradation converts tetrachloroethylene into ethylene and chloride.

References

Further reading

External links
ATSDR Case Studies in Environmental Medicine: Tetrachloroethylene Toxicity U.S. Department of Health and Human Services
Tetrachloroethylene (Perchloroethylene) U.S. Department of Health and Human Services
Australian National Pollutant Inventory (NPI) page
"Toxic Fumes May Have Made Gunman Snap", by Julian Kesner, New York Daily News, April 20, 2007.
Sustainable uses and Industry recommendations

Commodity chemicals
Dry cleaning
Halogenated solvents
Hazardous air pollutants
IARC Group 2A carcinogens
Chloroalkenes